Ivan Ivanovich Lappo (29 August 1869 – 23 December 1944) was a Russian historian. He specialized in history of the Grand Duchy of Lithuania, especially during the late medieval and early modern period. He shared the vision prevailing in Russian historiography, namely that the union between Lithuania and Poland was enforced by the latter. However, unlike most Russian scholars of the era, he kept maintaining that the Grand Duchy retained political autonomy and remained the subject of international politics. Throughout his career, he held academic seats at the universities of Tartu, Voronezh, Prague, Kaunas and Vilnius.

Academic career
Lappo began his teaching career by holding minor jobs at the University of St. Peterburg (1902–1905). Then he assumed the chair of Russian history in Juriev (1905–1918) and briefly held various jobs in Voronezh (1918–1919). On exile he kept teaching at the Russian University in Prague, Czechoslovakia (1923–1932) and at the Vytuautas the Great University in Kaunas, Lithuania (1933–1940).

Early years

Lappo descended from an old Ruthenian noble family, whose roots can be traced back to the 16th-century. It was related to what is now Eastern Belarus and its various representatives held estates between Minsk and Vitebsk. The branch of Lappo's ascendants did not hold land possessions; his father was a mid-range official in administration of the Synod of the Russian Orthodox Church, though his exact position is not clear.

In 1888 the 19-year-old Ivan entered the historical-philological faculty of St. Peterburg Imperial University. For reasons which are not known and were probably related to financial difficulties some time in the early 1890s he commenced teaching in of the high schools and graduated as late as 1902. His thesis gained the G. F. Karpov prize, awarded by the Russian Historical Society, and was published as a book. Its author was offered a junior teachning role at the university.

Teaching in Russia

In 1905 Lappo assumed the chair of Russian history at the University of Juriev (now Tartu). In 1911 he obtained PhD laurels at the University of Moscow and then became head of the historical department in Juriev; at the same time he was commissioned to prepare scientific edition of the Lithuanian Statute of 1588. In 1916 he was nominated to a historiographic committee of the Education Ministry.

Following German takeover of the Governorate of Livonia Lappo decided to leave for central Russia. In the summer of 1918 together with most of the university staff he was transferred to the bolshevik-held Voronezh. At the newly set-up local university and in somewhat chaotic circumstances he held various teaching roles, until in the spring of 1919 he was nominated head of the governorate's state archive.

Escape from Russia; Czechoslovakia

In October 1919 Voronezh was taken over by counter-revolutionary troops. Lappo seized the opportunity; at the university he applied for leave claiming health and family reasons, and then together with his wife and son he left the city towards the Black Sea coast. In 1920 in Novorossiysk they boarded a British evacuation ship and sailed to Greece, soon to move to the Kingdom of Serbs, Croats and Slovenes; Lappo was financially aided by the British.

In 1921 Lappo moved to Prague and contributed to setup of the Russian University, which opened in 1923. He held various chairs in history, kept publishing articles, brochures and books. In the mid-1920s he started to co-operate with the Lithuanian ministry of foreign affairs and kept preparing various memoranda, supposed to provide historical backing to Lithuanian political claims, advanced during the diplomatic row against Poland over Vilnius.

In Lithuania

In the early 1930s Lappo applied for a post at the Kaunas University, but was rejected as he did not speak Lithuanian. However, thanks to support of president Smetona, in 1932 he was contracted to carry out work on the Lithuanian Statute and moved to Kaunas. Since 1933 he taught at the university as a privatdozent. In 1938, he was awarded the Order of the Lithuanian Grand Duke Gediminas III degree, "for services to Lithuania". In 1939 and at request of the university he was granted the Lithuanian citizenship.

Following the fall of Poland in October 1939, Lappo was assigned to the newly set up Vilnius University, though he kept living in Kaunas. After the Soviet seizure of Lithuania new authorities terminated Lappo's contract, which left him in total financial misery. His status improved somewhat when following the German seizure of Lithuania in 1941 he was briefly employed as privatdozent at Vilnius University and then in 1942, he obtained a short-lived teaching contract. In unclear circumstances he left Lithuania and died in Dresden.

Works

Almost all of Lappo's historiographic output is related to the Grand Duchy of Lithuania, though the perspective differed. During the first half of his academic career Lappo focused mostly on exploring relations between the Duchy and the Kingdom of Poland, be it with regard to mechanics of the Lublin Union or with later relations between two components of the Polish-Lithuanian Commonwealth. During the second half and following his exile from Russia he re-calibrated his works to analysis of national identities in-between Russia and Poland, though he kept working on his opus magnum, the scholarly edition of Lithuanian statutes from the late 16th century.

Grand Duchy

Except his mid-term treaty on the Tver county in the 16th. century all Lappo's works have been dedicated to the Grand Duchy of Lithuania. Following minor detailed treaties on juridical establishments, published in the 1890s, his first major work was the graduation disseration Великое княжество Литовское за время от заключения Люблинской Унии до смерти Стефана Батория (1901), a legal-political study on the regime of Grand Duchy between 1569 and 1586. It was followed by the PhD thesis Великое княжество Литовское во второй половине XVI столетия (1911), which extended the analysis until the end of the 16th century. A spate of more focused analytical articles followed in the 1910s; they dealt mostly with various aspects of Lithuanian juridical and legal system, usually with regard to eastern voivodships of Vitebsk and Polock.

Western borderlands of Russia

On exile Lappo's works suffered from limited access to sources and his focus largely shifted to more general approach, exploring political history of Eastern Europe between Moscow/Russia, Grand Duchy of Lithuania and Poland. Западная Россия и её соединение с Польшей в их историческом прошлом (1924) explored Russian-Polish relations against the broad background of the modern era. Происхождение украинской идеологии Новейшего времени (1926) focused on emergent national identities on western Russia's borderlands, while Идея единства русского народа в Юго-Западной Руси в эпоху присоединения Малороссии к Московскому государству (1929) and Россия и славянство (1930) were studies which examined the Slovianophile idea, especially with regard to the Ukrainian territories. However, Lappo's key historiographic contribution is not an own narrative but en extremely competent and detailed monumental edition of the Lithuanian statutes; as Литовский Статут 1588 года it was issued in 4 volumes in Kaunas in the years of 1934–1936.

Key concepts
The Russian pre-revolutionary historiography, represented by Nikolay Gerasimovich Ustryalov, Mikhail Osipovich Koyalovich, Nikolay Alexeyevich Maksimieyko, Matvey Kuzmich Lyubavskiy and Fedor Ivanovich Leontovich, worked out a fairly definite assessment of the Union of Lublin and later position of the Grand Duchy within the Polish-Lithuanian Commonwealth. It presented the merger as engineered and carried out by the Poles, who enforced their own project to the detriment of the Lithuanians and which in course of the coming years deprived the Duchy of its own independent political standing. Lappo introduced major changes to this vision and partially presented his own perspective.

Lappo carried out a fairly detailed reconstruction of the Sejm of Lublin and the circumstances of the conclusion of the Polish-Lithuanian union in 1569. He agreed that the Poles were bent on imposing their own terms of the union upon the Lithuanians, though unlike fellow Russian scholars he distinguished between different positions adopted by the king, the magnates and most of the nobility, expressed in somewhat diverse visions advocated by the Senate and by the Chamber of Deputies. Lappo's general attitude towards the Union of Lublin remained negative; he sympathized with Lithuanians, seeing Poles as merely caring for their own interests.

Within the Russian historiography the innovative idea fathered by Lappo was that despite largely disadvantageous terms of the Union, the Grand Duchy retained its political identity and remained the subject of political game, both within the Commonwealth and internationally. He analysed in detail both the legal framework and the praxis; this provided him with arguments that the Crown of Poland has never managed to turn the Duchy into its province, and that when in the early 18th century Lithuania gradually became the object of politics it was rather because of international developments, especially against the background of the Swedish-Russian conflict.

Reception and legacy

Despite running against the main current, Lappo's graduation thesis was very well received; reviewers noticed attention to detail, great command of sources and holistic approach with wide coverage of the background. Some criticism was related to his alleged bias, reportedly stemming from sort of Lithuanian patriotism. The reception led to offering him the prestigious chair of Russian history in Juriev at the relatively young age of 36. Continuation of his work, formatted as a PhD thesis, was also widely acclaimed. The rector of the Moscow University Matvey Kuzmich Lyubavskiy suggested that Lappo's work be awarded the Karpov prize, he obtained long-term research contracts and was gradually emerging as a rising star of the Russian historiography.

Lappo's career in academic structures of imperial Russia was terminated due to political turmoil and revolution. When on exile in Czechoslovakia his work suffered from limited access to sources. His studies on national identities on western Russian borderlands are considered of lower quality; scholars underline rather Lappo's massive pedagogical effort in Prague. Acknowledgement of his research in the Republic of Lithuania was partially due to politics, as the Kaunas government was leaving no stone unturned in search for arguments that over the centuries Lithuania has been defending its sovereignty against Polish designs.

In the USSR Lappo went into almost total oblivion; if mentioned, it was so usually in relation to history of the Tartu University. He was stigmatized as scholar from “a historiograhic school characterised by lack of interest when it comes to position of the exploited popular masses”, “typical representative of the official conservative current of the bourgeoisie historiography during the imperialist period”, or static scholar, who was “unable to realize the nature of historical process” and “objective rules of development and reasons for aggravated social contradictions”.

In the post-Soviet era Lappo gained a few monographic articles by Lithuanian, Russian and Polish authors; they underline his profound knowledge of sources and scholarly competence when it comes to Grand Duchy of Lithuania in the modern era, even if some scholars note "quite paradoxical and partly incoherent" narrative. His scientific contribution is discussed against the background of political turmoil in Russia and Eastern Europe, which first condemned Lappo to 20 years of living on exile, and then trapped him in tragically destitute conditions during World War II.

See also
 Grand Duchy of Lithuania

Footnotes

Further reading
 Tomasz Ambroziak, Ivan Ivanovich Lappo’s views on the Circumstances of Establishing the Union of Lublin in the Context of pre-revolutionary Russian Historiography, [in:] Zapiski Historyczne LXXXIV (2019), pp. 97–122
 Людмила Дубьева, “Отдаюсь науке совсем…”. И. И. Лаппо – профессор русской истории Тартуского (Юрьевского) университета в 1905–1918 гг., [in:] Павел Лавринец (ed.), Балтийский архив. Русская культура в Прибалтике, vol. 9, Вильнюс 2005, pp. 374 – 391
 Ludmila Dub’eva, Ivan Ivanovič Lappo (1869–1944): „Ich möchte die Staatsordnung von Litauen untersuchen”, [in:] N. Angermann, W. Lenz, K. Maier (eds.), Geisteswissenschaft en und Publizistik im Baltikum des 19. und frühen 20. Jahrhunderts, Berlin 2011, pp. 513–539
 Повилас Ласинскас, И.И. Лаппо в Литве, [in:] Новый исторический вестник 1/12 (2005), pp. 186–196
 Povilas Lasinskas, Ivanas Lappo – Vytauto Didžiojo universiteto profesorius, [in:] Lituanistica 3/35 (1998), pp. 3–20
 Владимир П. Мякишев, И. И. Лаппо – ученый с живым чувством исторической действительности, [in:] Вестник ВГУ. Серия Гуманитарные науки 1 (2004), pp. 162–176
 Władimir Miakiszew, Iwan I. Łappo (1869–1944) – dwa wymiary życia uczonego, [in:] Taeduzs Bujnicki, Krzystof Stępnik (eds.), Ostatni obywatele Wielkiego Księstwa Litewskiego, Lublin 2005, pp. 307–315
 Aivas Ragauskas, Istorikas Ivanas Lappo ir Lietuva, [in:] Lietuvos istorijos metraštis, Vilnius 1994, pp. 81– 91

External links
 Myakishev's monograph article online

1869 births
1944 deaths
20th-century Russian historians
Saint Petersburg State University alumni
Academic staff of the University of Tartu
Academic staff of Vytautas Magnus University
Academic staff of Vilnius University
Recipients of the Order of the Lithuanian Grand Duke Gediminas
Soviet emigrants to Lithuania
Naturalized citizens of Lithuania
Deaths by airstrike during World War II
Civilians killed in World War II
People from Pushkin, Saint Petersburg